Natalia Skrabnevskaya (born in 1970) is a former competitive figure skater for the Soviet Union. She placed 7th at the 1990 European Championships.

Competitive highlights

References 

1970 births
Soviet female single skaters
Living people